Strongylognathus koreanus is a species of ant in the genus Strongylognathus. It can be found in Korea.

References

Strongylognathus
Hymenoptera of Asia
Insects described in 1966
Taxonomy articles created by Polbot